PsyMontréal is a psychology services company headquartered in Montreal, Quebec, Canada, with psychologists based in five area clinics in Outremont, Dollard-des-Ormeaux, Plateau Mont-Royal, Notre-Dame-de-Grâce and Downtown Montreal, who offer psychotherapy, coaching, and training services.

The psychotherapy, as well as life coaching and business coaching services are offered by psychologists who are members of the Ordre des psychologues du Québec, using empirically based methods such as cognitive behavioral therapy and motivational interviewing.

Notable contributions
PsyMontréal’s contribution to Quebec’s health care sector consists of being the first to provide trainings to the health care professionals of the Quebec government’s "Direction de santé publique" in Motivational Interviewing for the specific purposes of motivating positive health related lifestyle changes. Three Quebec government evaluation reports detail the state of major shifts in the way health care is being delivered in Quebec, with a shift away from intervention (i.e. waiting for somebody to get sick before entry to health care services), to the prevention of illnesses (motivating the population of Quebec to modify their lifestyles by eating better, exercising more, and stopping to smoke). The reports explain the government's prevention strategy and the key use of Motivational Interviewing (supported by the training and consulting services of PsyMontreal) over the last 6 years, based on scientifically based best practices.

In addition to providing the trainings, PsyMontréal itself has notably contributed to the knowledge base of Quebec health care professionals in the use of Motivational interviewing, as the trainers of PsyMontreal has had many articles (all related to the use of Motivational Interviewing to promote healthy lifestyle changes) published in various scientific and professional journals, including the official journals of Quebec's professional Orders of Psychologists, of Respiratory Specialists, of Nurses, and the official journal of the Canadian Thoracic Society.

PsyMontréal trainings were the subject of a RDI Santé television news program (the medical and health program of the Réseau de l'information news channel.

Members of PsyMontréal have also been interviewed about Motivational Interviewing trainings.

References

External links 
 PsyMontreal inc official website

Companies based in Montreal
Psychology organizations based in Canada